The Extra Mile – Points of Light Volunteer Pathway is a memorial in Washington D.C. Located adjacent to the White House, the monument is composed of 34 bronze medallions honoring people who "through their caring and personal sacrifice, reached out to others, building their dreams into movements that helped people across America and throughout the world". The medallions, each 42 inches in diameter, are embedded in sidewalks that form a one-mile walking path bounded by Pennsylvania Avenue, 15th Street, G Street, and 11th Street, NW. Each medallion includes a bas-relief likeness of one or more honorees, a description of their achievement and a quotation.

The Extra Mile was founded by John A. Johansen in 1992. Planning and development for the monument were managed by the Make a Difference Foundation until its merger with the Points of Light Foundation in 2002. The Extra Mile memorial was dedicated on October 14, 2005 in a ceremony attended by President George H. W. Bush and Barbara Bush.

Extra Mile Honorees

 Jane Addams – Founder, Hull House
 Edgar Allen – Founder, Easter Seals
 Ethel Percy Andrus – Founder, AARP
 Susan B. Anthony – Suffragist
 Roger Nash Baldwin – Founder, American Civil Liberties Union
 Ruth Standish Baldwin / Dr. George Haynes – Founders, National Urban League
 Ida Wells-Barnett – Leader of the anti-Lynching movement
 Clara Barton – Founder, American Red Cross
 Clifford Beers – Founder of the modern mental healthcare movement
 Ballington & Maud Booth – Founders, Volunteers of America
 William D. Boyce – Founder, Boy Scouts of America
 Wallace Campbell – Founder, CARE
 Rachel Carson – Environmentalist
 Cesar Chavez – Co-founder, United Farm Workers of America
 Ernest Kent Coulter – Founder, Big Brothers/Big Sisters of America
 Dorothea Dix – Advocate of the Reform of Institutions for the Mentally Ill
 Frederick Douglass – abolitionist
 Millard & Linda Fuller – Founder and Co-founder, Habitat for Humanity
 Hector Garcia – Founder, American G.I. Forum
 Samuel Gompers – Founder, American Federation of Labor
 Charlotte & Luther Gulick – Founder, Camp Fire
 William Edwin Hall – President, Boys and Girls Clubs of America
 Paul Harris – Founder, Rotary International
 Dorothy Height – Civil Rights Leader
 Edgar J. Helms – Founder, Goodwill Industries
 Melvin Jones – Founder, International Association of Lions Clubs
 Helen Keller – Founder, American Foundation for the Blind
 Martin Luther King Jr. – Civil Rights Leader
 Juliette Gordon Low – Founder, Girl Scouts of the USA
 John Muir – Conservationist
 Mary White Ovington / W. E. B. Du Bois – Founders, NAACP
 Eunice Kennedy Shriver – Founder, Special Olympics
 Robert Smith/William Wilson – Co-founders, Alcoholics Anonymous
 Harriet Tubman – Leader of Underground Railroad Effort to Free Slaves
 Booker T. Washington – Civil Rights Leader

References

External links

http://www.pointsoflight.org/recognition/extra-mile/educational-resources
http://www.pointsoflight.org/press-releases/points-light-institute-honors-volunteer-leaders-going-extra-mile

Monuments and memorials in Washington, D.C.
Bronze sculptures in Washington, D.C.
Halls of fame in Washington, D.C.
Walks of fame
2005 sculptures
2005 establishments in Washington, D.C.